Luis Arcangel Ramos Colon (born 11 April 1985) is a Honduran footballer, who last played for Marathón in the Liga Nacional de Fútbol Profesional de Honduras.

Club career
Ramos started his career with Marathón in Honduras and with MŠK Žilina and FC Nitra in the Slovak Superliga.

Debrecen
Ramos won the 2009–10 season of the Hungarian League with Debrecen despite his team lost to Kecskeméti TE in the last round. In 2010, Debrecen beat Zalaegerszegi TE in the Hungarian Cup final in the Puskás Ferenc Stadium by 3–2.

On 1 May 2012, Ramos won the Hungarian Cup with Debrecen by beating MTK Budapest on penalty shoot-out in the 2011–12 season. This was the fifth Hungarian Cup trophy for Debrecen.

On 12 May 2012, Ramos won the Hungarian League title with Debrecen after beating Pécs in the 28th round of the Hungarian League by 4–0 at the Oláh Gábor út Stadium which resulted the sixth Hungarian League title for the Hajdús.

Châteauroux
In 2013, Ramos signed with ligue 2 team Châteauroux. On February 13, 2014 he personally terminated his contract with the French team.

Teplice
Later he joined the ranks of then third placed team Teplice. He went on to make ten appearances while Teplice finished 5th at the end of the season.

AZAL
In July 2014 Ramos went on trial with Azerbaijan Premier League side AZAL, going onto sign permanently for the club later in the month.

Nyíregyháza Spartacus
In July 2015, Ramos returned to Nyíregyháza Spartacus.

Ramos is one of rare players from CONCACAF to have played in both the UEFA Champions League and the UEFA Europa League.

International career
Ramos was part of the Honduran U-20 team at the 2005 FIFA World Youth Championship in the Netherlands. He has not made his senior debut for Honduras yet, but was a non-playing squad member at the 2009 CONCACAF Gold Cup.

Career statistics

Honours
Debreceni VSC
Hungarian League (2): 2010, 2012
Hungarian Cup (3): 2010, 2012, 2013

Personal life
Luis Ramos is the older brother of footballer Anthony Lozano, who plays with Spanish football team Cádiz CF. He has also obtained Hungarian citizenship.

References

External links
HLSZ 

1985 births
Living people
People from San Pedro Sula
Association football midfielders
Honduran footballers
2009 CONCACAF Gold Cup players
C.D. Marathón players
MŠK Žilina players
FC Nitra players
Nyíregyháza Spartacus FC players
Debreceni VSC players
Kecskeméti TE players
LB Châteauroux players
FK Teplice players
Liga Nacional de Fútbol Profesional de Honduras players
Slovak Super Liga players
Ligue 2 players
Nemzeti Bajnokság I players
Czech First League players
Azerbaijan Premier League players
Honduran expatriate footballers
Expatriate footballers in Slovakia
Expatriate footballers in Hungary
Expatriate footballers in France
Honduran expatriate sportspeople in Slovakia
Honduran expatriate sportspeople in Hungary
Honduran expatriate sportspeople in France